Nordic combined at the 2017 Winter Universiade was held in Alatau Cross-Country Skiing & Biathlon Complex from February 1 to February 5, 2017.

Events

Medal table

References

External links
Nordic combined at the 2017 Winter Universiade.
Results book

Nordic combined
2017
2017 in Nordic combined